Robert Gore (1810 – 4 August 1854) was an Irish Whig politician and naval officer.

He was the son of colonel William John Gore and Caroline née Hales and, at some point, gained the rank of captain in the Royal Navy, and the office of Chargé d'Affaires in Uruguay.

He was a member of Brooks's, Crockford's, the Naval and Military Club, and the Travellers Club.

References

External links
 

UK MPs 1841–1847
Whig (British political party) MPs for Irish constituencies
1810 births
1854 deaths